Moravagine is a 1926 novel by Blaise Cendrars, published by Grasset. It is a complex opus, with a central figure (the Moravagine character) like a dark persona of the author which he gets rid of through writing. Its genesis took a decade (with Cendrars hinting at it as early as 1917) and Cendrars never stopped working on it. In 1956, the author somewhat rewrote the text, added a postface and a section titled "Pro domo: How I wrote Moravagine". In its ultimate revision, Cendrars says the book is definitely incomplete, as it was meant to be a preface to a "complete works of Moravagine" that are not there.

Synopsis
The narrator, Raymond la Science, presented as a Blaise Cendrars' acquaintance (who himself appears in the novel), writes how, being a physician, he comes across Moravagine, a killer madman detained in an asylum. Moravagine is the last, degenerate heir to a long line of Eastern Europe noblemen. Fascinated by this man, the physician helps him escape then shares his picaresque travel around the world, bumping from Russian terrorists to American natives, in a trail of crimes. Finally they return to Europe just in time for World War I, when "the whole world was doing a Moravagine."

Style, Death and Woman
While characters live a wild adventure, the style in contrast is straight and controlled (as opposed to, for instance, Journey to the End of the Night). This contrast contributes to the peculiar feelings some readers have when reading the novel.

"Moravagine" sounds in French like "mort-a-vagin", or in English, "death-has-vagina" or "death-to-vagina". Indeed, Moravagine kills women, while in chapter I (about a woman named Masha), we can read 
La femme est sous le signe de la lune, ce reflet, cet astre mort, et c'est pourquoi plus la femme enfante, plus elle engendre la mort.
Woman is under the sign of the moon, this reflection, this dead star, and that is why the more Woman gives birth, the more she engenders death.
New York Review Books Classics edition of the book has a cover figuring a skeleton in woman dress.

Cendrars was quite conscious that Moravagine was some sort of an other, different, himself. In pro domo he wrote
J'ai nourri, élevé un parasite à mes dépens. A la fin je ne savais plus qui de nous plagiait l'autre. Il a voyagé à ma place. Il a fait l'amour à ma place. Mais il n'y a jamais eu réelle identification car chacun était soi, moi et l'Autre. Tragique tête-à-tête qui fait que l'on ne peut écrire qu'un livre ou plusieurs fois le même livre. C'est pourquoi tous les beaux livres se ressemblent. Ils sont tous autobiographiques. C'est pourquoi il y a un seul sujet littéraire: l'homme. C'est pourquoi il n'y a qu'une littérature: celle de cet homme, de cet Autre, l'homme qui écrit.
I fed, raised a parasite at my expense. At the end I no longer knew who plagiarized the other. He traveled in my place. He made love in my place. But there was never a real identification because each one was self, me and the Other. A tragic one-on-one that makes it possible to write only one book or several times the same book. That is why all fine books are alike. They are all autobiographical. This is why there is only one literary subject: man. That is why there is only one literature: that of this man, this Other, the man who writes.

Inspirations
Among real people that may have been used as models, have been cited:
 Otto Gross, physician and psychoanalyst
 Adolf Wölfli (1864–1930), very violent psychotic inmate of Waldau's Asylum, near Berne, known for his prolific Outsider art work. 
 Favez, nicknamed "Ropraz's Vampire", a Swiss felon that Cendrars may have met during World War I while in the French army.

Editions 
 Moravagine, Paris, Grasset, 1926.
 Moravagine, Paris, Le Club français du livre, 1947.
 Moravagine, Paris, Grasset, 1956. Édition revue et augmentée de "Pro domo : comment j'ai écrit Moravagine" et d'une postface.
 Moravagine, Paris, Le Livre de Poche, 1957.
 Moravagine, Lausanne, La Guilde du Livre, 1961 (version de 1926).
 Moravagine, Paris, Club des Amis du Livre, avant-propos de Claude Roy, illustrations de Pierre Chaplet, 1961.
 Moravagine, dans Œuvres complètes, t. II, Paris, Denoël, 1961.
 Moravagine, Lausanne, Éditions Rencontre, 1969.
 Moravagine, dans Œuvres complètes, t. IV, Paris, Le Club français du livre, 1969. Préface de Raymond Dumay.
 Moravagine, Paris, Grasset, coll. "Les Cahiers rouges", 1983.
 Moravagine, Paris, Denoël, coll. "Tout autour d'aujourd'hui", t. 7, 2003. Moravagine est suivi de La Fin du monde filmée par l'Ange N.-D, "Le Mystère de l'Ange Notre-Dame", et de L'Eubage. Textes présentés et annotés par Jean-Carlo Flückiger.

Critics references
 Flückiger,  Jean-Carlo, Au cœur du texte. Essai sur Blaise Cendrars, Neuchâtel, À la Baconnière, 1977.
 Touret, Michèle, Blaise Cendrars. Le désir du roman (1920-1930), Paris, Champion, coll. "Cahiers Blaise Cendrars", n° 6, 1999.
 Sous le signe de Moravagine (études réunies par Jean-Carlo Flückiger et Claude Leroy), Paris-Caen, Minard-Lettres modernes, série "Blaise Cendrars", n° 6, 2006.

Studies
 Oxana Khlopina, Moravagine de Blaise Cendrars, Bienne-Gollion/Paris, ACEL-Infolio éditions, collection Le cippe, 2012.

References

French-language novels
1926 novels